Adela Nora Rogers St. Johns (May 20, 1894 – August 10, 1988) was an American journalist, novelist, and screenwriter. She wrote a number of screenplays for silent movies but is best remembered for her groundbreaking exploits as "The World's Greatest Girl Reporter" during the 1920s and 1930s and her celebrity interviews for Photoplay magazine.

Early life
St. Johns was born in Los Angeles, the only daughter of Los Angeles criminal lawyer Earl Rogers (who was a friend of publishing magnate William Randolph Hearst) and his wife, Harriet Belle Greene. She attended Hollywood High School, graduating in 1910.

Career

She obtained her first job in 1912 working as a reporter for Hearst's San Francisco Examiner. She reported on crime, politics, society, and sports news before transferring to the Los Angeles Herald in 1913.

After seeing her work for that newspaper, James R. Quirk offered her a job writing for his new fan magazine Photoplay. St. Johns accepted the job so she could spend more time with her husband and children. Her celebrity interviews helped the magazine become a success through her numerous revealing interviews with Hollywood film stars. She also wrote short stories for Cosmopolitan, The Saturday Evening Post, and other magazines and finished nine of her thirteen screenplays before returning to reporting for Hearst newspapers.

Writing in a distinctive, emotional style, St. Johns reported on, among other subjects, the controversial Jack Dempsey–Gene Tunney "long-count" fight in 1927, the treatment of the poor during the Great Depression, and the 1935 trial of Bruno Richard Hauptmann for kidnapping and murdering the son of Charles Lindbergh.

In the mid-1930s, she moved to Washington, D.C., to report on national politics for the Washington Herald. There she became prominent among a group of female reporters working for Cissy Patterson. Her coverage of the assassination of Senator Huey Long in 1935, the abdication of King Edward VIII in 1936, the Democratic National Convention of 1940, and other major stories made her one of the best-known reporters of the day. St. Johns again left newspaper work in 1948 in order to write books, and to teach journalism at UCLA.

In 1962, she published Final Verdict, a biography of her father Earl Rogers. The book was adapted for a TNT television film of the same name in 1991; Olivia Burnette portrayed the young St. Johns.

Later years
St. Johns was awarded the Presidential Medal of Freedom on April 22, 1970.

During the late 1960s and 1970s, St. Johns was a frequent guest on various talk shows including both Jack Paar's and Johnny Carson's The Tonight Show and The Merv Griffin Show. During one Tonight Show visit, Paar noted that St. Johns had known many legends of Hollywood's Golden Age and was once rumored to have had Clark Gable's child. St. Johns quipped, "Well, who wouldn't have wanted to have Clark Gable's baby?" Paar inquired if there was anything she wanted to do that she had not yet done in her rather incredible life, St. Johns replied, "I just want to live long enough to see how it all turns out."

In 1976, at the age of 82, she returned to reporting for the Examiner to cover the bank robbery and conspiracy trial of Patty Hearst, granddaughter of her former employer. In the late 1970s, St. Johns hosted a miniseries chronicling Gable's films, which appeared on Iowa Public Television. Around the same time she was interviewed for the television documentary series Hollywood: A Celebration of the American Silent Film (1980).

The following year, St. Johns appeared with other early 20th-century figures as one of the 'witnesses' in Warren Beatty's Reds (1981). St. Johns spent her remaining years living in Arroyo Grande, California.

Personal life 
St. Johns was married three times and had four children. Her first marriage was to Los Angeles Herald chief copy editor William Ivan St. Johns, whom she married in 1914. They had two children, Elaine and William Ivan, Jr. before divorcing in 1927. The following year, she married one-time Stanford University football star Richard Hyland. They had one son, Richard, and divorced in 1934. St. Johns' third marriage was to F. Patrick O'Toole, an airline executive. They married in 1936 and divorced in October 1942. After her third divorce, St. Johns adopted a son as a single parent.

Death 
On August 10, 1988, St. Johns died at the South County Convalescent Hospital in Arroyo Grande, California at the age of 94. She is buried at Forest Lawn Memorial Park in Glendale, California.

Bibliography

Books
 The Skyrocket (Cosmopolitan, 1925) [novel]
 A Free Soul (Cosmopolitan, 1927) [novel]
 The Single Standard (Grosset & Dunlap, 1928) [novelization of her screenplay]
 Field of Honor (E.P. Dutton, 1938) [novel]
 The Root of All Evil (E.P. Dutton, 1940) [novel]
 Never Again, and Other Stories (Doubleday, 1949)
 How to Write a Story and Sell It (Doubleday, 1956)
 Affirmative Prayers in Action (Dodd, Mead, 1957)
 First Step up Toward Heaven: Hubert Eaton and Forest Lawn (Prentice-Hall, 1959)
 Final Verdict (Doubleday, 1962) [biography of her father, Earl Rogers]
 Tell No Man (Doubleday, 1966) [novel]
 The Honeycomb (Doubleday, 1969) [autobiography]
 Some are Born Great (Doubleday, 1974) [stories about great women the author had known]
 Love, Laughter, and Tears: My Hollywood Story (Doubleday, 1978) [memoir]
 No Good-byes: My Search into Life Beyond Death (McGraw-Hill, 1982)

Articles
 "Do You Have a Story to Tell?," The Writer, August 1953

Filmography

Acting 
 Reds (1981)

Screenplays 

 Old Love for New (1918)
 Marked Cards (1918)
 The Secret Code (1918)
 Broken Laws (1924)
 Inez from Hollywood (The Worst Woman in Hollywood, 1924)
 Lady of the Night (1925)
 The Red Kimona (1925)
 The Skyrocket (1926)
 The Wise Guy (1926)
 The Broncho Twister (1927)
 Children of Divorce (1927)
 Singed (1927)
 The Patent Leather Kid (1927)
 The Arizona Wildcat (1927)
 The Heart of a Follies Girl (1928)
 Lilac Time (1928)
 Scandal (1929)
 The Single Standard (1929)
 A Free Soul (1931)
 What Price Hollywood? (1932)
 Miss Fane's Baby Is Stolen (1934)
 A Woman's Man (1934)
 A Star Is Born (1937, uncredited)
 Back in Circulation (1937)
 The Great Man's Lady (1942)
 Government Girl (1943)
 That Brennan Girl (1946)
 Smart Woman (1948)
 The Girl Who Had Everything (1953, based on her novel A Free Soul)

Teleplays 
 General Electric Theater (Episode: "The Crime of Daphne Rutledge", 1954)
 Alfred Hitchcock Presents (Episode: "Never Again", 1955)

Footnotes

References 
 Herbert Howe, "Photoplay's Hollywood Astronomers: 'Our Adela'," Photoplay, November 1923, p. 54. Biography.
 The Honeycomb, Doubleday & Company, Garden City, New York, 1969, pp. 207, 228.

External links 
 
 Adela Rogers St. Johns at the Women Film Pioneers Project
 "Jean Harlow Tells the Inside Story; For the First Time the Platinum Venus of the Screen Explains the Mystery of Her Husband's Suicide" by Adela Rogers St. Johns. Liberty, November 26, 1932
 
 
 

1894 births
1988 deaths
20th-century American novelists
20th-century American biographers
American women biographers
20th-century American memoirists
Screenwriters from California
American television writers
American women novelists
Burials at Forest Lawn Memorial Park (Glendale)
American gossip columnists
American women columnists
Hollywood High School alumni
Presidential Medal of Freedom recipients
University of California, Los Angeles faculty
Writers from Los Angeles
American women screenwriters
American women memoirists
American women essayists
20th-century American women writers
People from Arroyo Grande, California
Novelists from California
Women film pioneers
20th-century American essayists
American women television writers
20th-century American screenwriters